Narrab (also Romanized as Narrāb) is a village in Cheshmeh Saran Rural District, Cheshmeh Saran District, Azadshahr County, Golestan Province, Iran. At the 2006 census, its population was 1,972, in 440 families.

References 

Populated places in Azadshahr County